Francisco Macabulos y Soliman (September 17, 1871 – April 20, 1922), commonly known today as Francisco Makabulos, was a Filipino patriot and revolutionary general who led the Katipunan revolutionary forces during the Philippine Revolution against Spain in 1896.

Biography
Francisco Macabulos was born in La Paz, Tarlac, to Alejandro Macabulos of Lubao, Pampanga, and Gregoria Soliman. Within his lifetime, his native surname was often spelled with a C instead of K following Spanish orthography, but later linguistic reforms leading to the Philippine national language of Filipino means it is commonly spelled with a K today. 

He organized the first Katipunan group there after he was inducted into the secret society by Ladislao Diwa in 1896. When the revolution broke out in 1898, he liberated Tarlac and established town councils in areas he liberated.

Macabulos refused to honor the Pact of Biak-na-Bato, which called for a truce with the Spanish colonial government, and continued operations in Central Luzon. However, on January 14, 1898, he disbanded his troops and accepted amnesty after receiving 14,000 pesos as part of Spanish reparations to Filipino revolutionaries. Macabulos distributed the money to his men.

Nonetheless, Macabulos resumed operations against the Spanish and on April 17, 1898, an assembly of citizens representing the town councils Macabulos established, calling themselves representatives of Central Luzon, met and drafted a provisional constitution. They created the Central Executive Committee, a government that was to exist "until a general government of the Republic in these islands shall again be established", consisting of a president, vice president, secretary of interior, secretary of war and a secretary of the treasury. 

Macabulos dissolved his government after the First Philippine Republic was created by the Malolos Constitution, which he also signed. He also led his men to free nearby provinces, like Pangasinan where he led revolutionists in the Battle of Dagupan.

Images

References

 National Historical Institute, Filipinos in History 5 vols. (Manila: National Historical Institute, 1995)
 Dizon, Lino L. Francisco Makabulos Soliman: A Biographical Study of a Local Revolutionary Hero (Tarlac, Tarlac: Center for Tarlaqueño Studies, 1994)
 Kalaw, Maximo M. The Development of Philippine Politics (Manila, Oriental Commercial Co. Inc., 1922)

External links

 Remembering the Zenith of Tarlac Nationalism: A Tribute to the Valor of Gen. Francisco Makabulos (1871–1922)
 Today in Philippine History, September 17, 1871, Francisco Makabulos was born in La Paz, Tarlac
Gen. Francisco Macabulos and Sta. Ignacia, Tarlac: The Untold History

Filipino generals
Kapampangan people
1871 births
1922 deaths
Paramilitary Filipinos
People of the Philippine Revolution
Governors of Tarlac
Mayors of places in Tarlac
People from Tarlac